Arturo Reyes can refer to:

 Arturo Reyes (writer) (1864-1913), Spanish writer
 Arturo Lona Reyes (1925–2020), Mexican bishop
 Arturo Reyes (footballer) (born 1969), Colombian football manager and former footballer